Darevskia steineri, also known commonly as Steiner's lizard, is a species of lizard in the family Lacertidae. The species is endemic to Iran.

Etymology
The specific name, steineri, is in honor of Austrian herpetologist Hans M. Steiner.

Geographic range
D. steineri is found in northeastern Iran.

Habitat
The preferred natural habitats of D. steineri are forest and rocky areas. It can be found on tree trunks and the forest floor in the Hyrcanian forest.

Description
It has a greenish belly, unlike the reddish bellies of closely related species.

Reproduction
D. steineri is oviparous.

References

Further reading
Arnold EN, Arribas O, Carranza S (2007). "Systematics of the Palaearctic and Oriental lizard tribe Lacertini (Squamata: Lacertidae: Lacertinae), with descriptions of eight new genera". Zootaxa 1430: 1–86. (Darevskia steineri, new combination).
Eiselt J (1995). "Ein Beitrag zur Kenntnis der Archaeolacerten (sensu Méhely, 1909) des Iran ". Herpetozoa 8 (1–2): 59–72. (Lacerta steineri, new species, pp. 63–64, 68, Plate 1). (in German, with an abstract in English).
Sindaco R, Jeremčenko VK (2009). The Reptiles of the Western Palearctic. 1. Annotated Checklist and Distributional Atlas of the Turtles, Crocodiles, Amphisbaenians and Lizards of Europe, North Africa, Middle East and Central Asia. (Monographs of the Societas Herpetologica Italica). Latina, Italy: Edizioni Belvedere. 580 pp. .

Darevskia
Reptiles described in 1995
Taxa named by Josef Eiselt
Reptiles of Iran
Endemic fauna of Iran